Friedrich Hirschl (born 24 January 1888, date of death unknown) was an Austrian footballer. He played in two matches for the Austria national football team in 1908.

References

External links
 

1888 births
Year of death missing
Austrian footballers
Austria international footballers
Place of birth missing
Association footballers not categorized by position